Thulium(III) nitrate is an inorganic compound, a salt of thulium and nitric acid with the chemical formula . The compound forms dark-green crystals, readily soluble in water, also forms crystalline hydrates.

Synthesis
Reaction of thulium and nitric acid:

Reaction of thulium hydroxide and nitric acid:

Physical properties
Thulium(III) nitrate forms dark-green hygroscopic crystals.

Forms crystalline hydrates of the composition .

Soluble in water and ethanol.

Chemical properties
Both the compound and its crystalline hydrate decompose on moderate heating.

Hydrated thulium nitrate thermally decomposes to form  and decomposes to thulium oxide upon further heating.

Applications
Thulium(III) nitrate hydrate is used as a reagent. Also used in optical glasses, ceramics, catalysts, electrical components, and photo-optical materials.

References

Thulium compounds
Nitrates